HDR Rice Daubney, formerly Rice Daubney, is a Sydney based architectural practice with over 100 staff. In 2013 the firm was acquired by HDR, a US-based architectural, engineering and consulting firm and rebranded as HDR Rice Daubney.

Rice Daubney have a broad range of work which covers most sectors of the architectural design industry. The firm has a strong emphasis on the use of Building Information Modelling (BIM) as a design tool and has also demonstrated a continuous desire to be at the forefront of implementing sustainable design practices in building. Rice Daubney pioneered the use of a new glazing system for multi-storey buildings and foresaw a shift away from high-rise office towers to lower-scale, more personalised buildings.

History
In 1976 Kevin Rice left the firm Fombertaux Rice Hanly where he had been managing director and with another former employee of Fombertaux Rice Hanly, John Daubney jointly established Rice Daubney. Early projects that helped establish the firms reputation include the Queen Victoria Building renovation/restoration (completed 1986) and the Zenith Centre in Chatswood (completed 1987). Additional offices were opened in Jakarta in late 1987 and Brisbane in 2004. In 2013 the firm merged with US-based global architecture firm HDR.

When Kevin Rice retired in 1990, John Daubney took over as managing director. Rice Daubney employ over 100 staff, the majority of these in its head office in Sydney.

Notable projects

HDR Rice Daubney has designed some of Australia's landmark buildings including the following major architectural projects:

See also

Architecture of Australia

References

External links
Rice Daubney Website
Previous List of Winners of NSW Sulman Award for Public Buildings 

Architecture firms of Australia
1976 establishments in Australia